August Otto Föppl (25 January 1854 – 12 August 1924) was a professor of Technical Mechanics and Graphical Statics at the Technical University of Munich, Germany.  He is credited with introducing the Föppl–Klammer theory and the Föppl–von Kármán equations (large deflection of elastic plates).

Life
His doctoral advisor was Gustav Heinrich Wiedemann and one of Föppl's first doctoral students was Ludwig Prandtl, his future son-in-law. He had two sons Ludwig Föppl and Otto Föppl. Ludwig Föppl who was a mechanical engineer and Professor of Technical Mechanics at the Technical University of Munich. Otto Föppl who was an engineer and Professor of Applied Mechanics at the Technical University of Braunschweig for 30 years.

Career
In 1894, Föppl wrote a widely read introductory book on Maxwell's theory of electricity, titled Einführung in die Maxwellsche Theorie der Elektrizität. This 1894 book pioneered the use of Maxwell's theory in Germany and made Föppl famous as a scientist. Gerald Holton argues, that some arguments of Föppl concerning electromagnetic induction, had some influence on Albert Einstein's first paper on special relativity.

See also
Rotordynamics

References

External links

 

1854 births
1924 deaths
Engineers from Hesse
Academic staff of the Technical University of Munich
People from Groß-Umstadt